Tudor Brewery is a microbrewery  in Llanhilleth, Blaenau Gwent, Wales. In 2016, the company's Black Rock Ale won the CAMRA award for Champion Beer of Wales.

References

External links

Breweries in Wales
Blaenau Gwent